Madhuri Itagi (born 7 October 1988) is an Indian actress and reality television personality. She has acted in Kannada films like Rambo (2012) and Ouija (2015). She is also well known for her part in the reality TV show "Bigg Boss Kannada 3"; she was eliminated from it in the first round of participation. She was also crowned Miss Karnataka in 2011.

She is from Hubballi.

Filmography

See also

 List of people from Karnataka
 Cinema of Karnataka
 List of Indian film actresses
 Cinema of India

References

External links 
 

Living people
1988 births
Actresses in Kannada cinema
Bigg Boss Kannada contestants
Indian film actresses
People from Hubli